Below is a list of philosophy articles from D-H.

D 

 D. F. M. Strauss
 D. H. Mellor
 D. Hugh Mellor
 D. T. Suzuki
 D. V. Gundappa
 D.H. Mellor
 Dada
 Daemon (classical mythology)
 Dag Prawitz
 Dagfinn Follesdal
 Dagfinn Føllesdal
 Dagobert D. Runes
 Dagpo Tashi Namgyal
 Dai Zhen
 Daimonic
 Dale Beyerstein
 Dallas Willard
 Damaris Cudworth Masham
 Damaris Masham
 Damascius
 Damião de Góis
 Damien Keown
 Damis
 Damo (philosopher)
 Damon Young
 Dan Georgakas
 Dan Wikler
 Dan Zahavi
 Dana Scott
 Dana Ward
 Daniel-Henry Kahnweiler
 Daniel Bensaïd
 Daniel Brock
 Daniel Callahan
 Daniel Dennett
 Daniel Dombrowski
 Daniel Guérin
 Daniel Innerarity
 Daniel Kolak
 Daniel N. Robinson
 Daniel of Morley
 Daniel Raymond
 Daniel Ross (Australian philosopher and filmmaker)
 Daniel Rynhold
 Danilo Pejović
 Danish philosophy
 Danko Grlić
 Dante Alighieri
 Danube school
 Dao
 Daodejing
 Daoism
 Daoist philosophy
 Dardanus of Athens
 Dariush Shayegan
 Dark City (1998 film)
 Darwin's Dangerous Idea
 Darwiniana
 Darwinism
 Daryoush Ashouri
 Das Argument (journal)
 Das Kapital
 Dasein
 Data dredging
 Data exchange language
 Data system
 Dau al Set
 Dave Andrews
 David (commentator)
 David Abram
 David Alan Johnson
 David Albert
 David Anhaght
 David B. Kaplan
 David B. Malament
 David Basinger
 David Bell (philosopher)
 David ben Merwan al-Mukkamas
 David Benatar
 David Blitz
 David Braine (philosopher)
 David Brewster
 David Chalmers
 David Charles (philosopher)
 David Cockburn
 David Conway (academic)
 David Corfield
 David D. Friedman
 David E. Cooper
 David Edmonds (philosopher)
 David Efird
 David Estlund
 David Farrell Krell
 David Fordyce
 David Friedrich Strauss
 David Gauthier
 David George Ritchie
 David Graeber
 David H. M. Brooks
 David H. Sanford
 David Hartley
 David Hartley (philosopher)
 David Hilbert
 David Hull (philosopher)
 David Hume
 David James Jones
 David Kalupahana
 David Kaplan (philosopher)
 David Kelley
 David Kellogg Lewis
 David Koepsell
 David Kolb
 David L. Norton
 David L. Paulsen
 David Loy
 David M. Rosenthal
 David Makinson
 David Malet Armstrong
 David Miller (philosopher)
 David Miller (political theorist)
 David N. Stamos
 David Nicoll (anarchist)
 David of Dinant
 David Oswald Thomas
 David P. Gushee
 David Papineau
 David Pearce (philosopher)
 David Pears
 David Prall
 David Prychitko
 David Ray Griffin
 David Ricardo
 David Rynin
 David S. Oderberg
 David Schmidtz
 David Sedley
 David Skrbina
 David Sosa
 David Stenhouse
 David Stove
 David Strauss
 David Strong
 David Sztybel
 David van Goorle
 David Watson (anarchist)
 David Wiggins
 David Williams (philosopher)
 David Wong (philosopher)
 David Wood (philosopher)
 Dawkins vs. Gould
 Dax Cowart
 Daxue
 Days of War, Nights of Love
 De Arte Combinatoria
 De Brevitate Vitae (Seneca)
 De Cive
 De Coelesti Hierarchia
 De dicto
 De dicto and de re
 De dicto necessity
 De Divinatione
 De divisione naturae
 De Docta Ignorantia
 De finibus bonorum et malorum
 De Interpretatione
 De Legibus
 De libero arbitrio diatribe sive collatio
 De Morgan's law
 De Morgan's laws
 De Mysteriis Aegyptiorum
 De Natura Deorum
 De Officiis
 De Providentia
 De re
 De re necessity
 De re publica
 De rerum natura
 De se
 De spectaculis
 De Stijl
 De Veritate
 De Vita Beata
 De vita libri tres
 Dean Komel
 Dean Zimmerman (philosopher)
 Death
 Death-of-the-author thesis
 Death in Venice
 Death instinct
 Death into Life
 Death of Carlo Giuliani
 Death of God
 Death of the Author
 Death, Desire and Loss in Western Culture
 Deaths of philosophers
 Debendranath Tagore
 Debiprasad Chattopadhyaya
 Debt
 Debt bondage
 Decadence
 Decadent movement
 Decadentism
 Decedent directive
 Decembrio – family of scholars
 Decidability
 Decidable
 Decision analysis
 Decision analysis cycle
 Decision procedure
 Decision theory
 Decision tree
 Decisionism
 Declaration of Geneva
 Declaration of Helsinki
 Declarationism
 Decline of Greco-Roman polytheism
 Deconstruction
 Dedekind cut
 Deduction
 Deduction and induction
 Deduction theorem
 Deductive
 Deductive-nomological model
 Deductive closure
 Deductive closure principle
 Deductive fallacy
 Deductive reasoning
 Deep ecology
 Deep inference
 Deep structure
 Deepak Kumar (historian)
 Default logic
 Defeasible
 Defeasible logic
 Defeasible reasoning
 Defeater
 Defeatism
 Defensive democracy
 Defensivism
 Definiendum
 Definiens
 Defining Issues Test
 Definist fallacy
 Definite clause grammar
 Definite description
 Definite descriptions
 Definition
 Definition of music
 Definitionism
 Definitions of fascism
 Definitions of logic
 Deflationary theory of truth
 Degenerate case
 Degenerated workers' state
 Degree of belief
 Degree of truth
 Deicide
 Deism
 Delegate model of representation
 Delegated authority
 Deleuze and Guattari
 Delfim Santos
 Deliberative democracy
 Demarcation problem
 Demetrius Chalcondyles
 Demetrius Lacon
 Demetrius of Amphipolis
 Demetrius of Phalerum
 Demetrius the Cynic
 Demiurge
 Democracy
 Democracy in Marxism
 Democrates
 Democratic centralism
 Democratic consolidation
 Democratic deficit
 Democratic ideals
 Democratic Rationalization
 Democratic socialism
 Democratic structuring
 Democritus
 Demodocus (dialogue)
 Demonax
 Demonstration (people)
 Demonstrative
 Demonstratives
 Dempster–Shafer theory
 Denial
 Denis Diderot
 Denis Dutton
 Denis the Carthusian
 Denny's paradox
 Denotation
 Denotative meaning
 Denumerable
 Denying the antecedent
 Denying the consequent
 Denying the correlative
 Denys de Leeuwis
 Denys the Carthusian
 Denys Turner
 Deodorus Cronos
 Deontic
 Deontic logic
 Deontological
 Deontological ethics
 Deontological libertarianism
 Deontologism
 Dependability
 Dependent type
 Depiction
 Déprimisme
 Derech Hashem
 Derek Parfit
 Derivation
 Derivational logicism
 Derivative algebra (abstract algebra)
 Dérive
 Dermot Moran
 Derrick Jensen
 Derveni papyrus
 Description
 Description logic
 Descriptions
 Descriptive ethics
 Descriptive knowledge
 Descriptive science
 Descriptivism
 Descriptivist theory of names
 Desert
 Desert (philosophy)
 Desiderius Erasmus
 Design
 Desire (emotion)
 Desire (in Philosophy)
 Desire (philosophy)
 Desire Mercier
 Desire Philosophy
 Desire realm
 Desiring-production
 Desmond Clarke
 Despair
 Destiny
 Destructive dilemma
 Detachment (philosophy)
 Determinable
 Determinables
 Determinate
 Determinism
 Deterministic automaton
 Deterministic context-free grammar
 Deterministic context-free language
 Deterministic system (philosophy)
 Deterrence
 Deterritorialization
 Deus
 Developmental biology
 Deviance
 Deviant logic
 Device paradigm
 Dewi Zephaniah Phillips
 Dewitt H. Parker
 Dexippus (philosopher)
 Dhammapala
 Dharani
 Dhardo Rimpoche
 Dharma
 Dharma (Jainism)
 Dharma transmission
 Dharmakāya
 Dharmakirti
 Dharmakīrti
 Dharmarāja Adhvarin
 Dharmarakṣa
 Dharmarakshita (Sumatran)
 Diafotismos
 Diagonalization
 Diagoras of Melos
 Diagrammatic reasoning
 Diairesis
 Dial House, Essex
 Dialectic
 Dialectic of Enlightenment
 Dialectic process vs. dialogic process
 Dialectica
 Dialectical materialism
 Dialectical monism
 Dialectician
 Dialectics
 Dialetheism
 Dialethism
 Diallelus
 Dialogism
 Dialogue
 Dialogues concerning Natural Religion
 Diamond net
 Diamond Realm
 Diana Schaub
 Dianoia
 Dicaearchus
 Dichotomy
 Dichotomy paradox
 Dick de Jongh
 Dictatorship of the proletariat
 Dictes and Sayings of the Philosophers
 Diction
 Dictionaries and encyclopedias of philosophy
 Dictionnaire philosophique
 Dicto simpliciter
 Dictum
 Dictum de omni et nullo
 Didacticism
 Diderik Batens
 Die Anarchisten
 Die Freien
 Die Freiheit
 Diego de Zúñiga
 Dielo Truda
 Dieter Henrich
 Dietrich Bonhoeffer
 Dietrich of Freiberg
 Dietrich Tiedemann
 Dietrich von Hildebrand
 Différance
 Difference (philosophy)
 Difference and Repetition
 Difference principle
 Differentia
 Differential and Absolute Ground Rent
 Digital philosophy
 Dignaga
 Dignāga
 Dignitas (Roman concept)
 Dignity
 Dilemma
 Dimension
 Diminished capacity
 Diminished responsibility
 Diminished responsibility in English law
 Dimiter Skordev
 Dimitri Uznadze
 Dimitrie Cantemir
 Dimitrie Cuclin
 Dimitrije Mitrinović
 Dimitrios Roussopoulos
 Dimitris Dimitrakos
 Ding-an-sich
 Ding an sich
 Dio Chrysostom
 Dio of Alexandria
 Diocles of Cnidus
 Diodorus Cronus
 Diodorus of Adramyttium
 Diodorus of Aspendus
 Diodorus of Tyre
 Diodotus the Stoic
 Diogenes (journal)
 Diogenes Allen
 Diogenes Laërtius
 Diogenes of Apollonia
 Diogenes of Babylon
 Diogenes of Oenoanda
 Diogenes of Seleucia (Epicurean)
 Diogenes of Sinope
 Diogenes of Tarsus
 Diogenes the Cynic
 Dionysian
 Dionysian and Apollonian
 Dionysius of Chalcedon
 Dionysius of Cyrene
 Dionysius of Lamptrai
 Dionysius the Renegade
 Diotima of Mantinea
 Diotimus the Stoic
 Dipolar theism
 Direct action
 Direct and indirect realism
 Direct Action: Memoirs of an Urban Guerrilla
 Direct democracy
 Direct experience
 Direct realism
 Direct reference
 Direct reference theory
 Direct revelation
 Direction of fit
 Directoire style
 Director primacy
 Direkte Aktion
 Dirk Verhofstadt
 Dirty hands
 Disbarment
 Disciples of Confucius
 Disciples of Plotinus
 Disciplinary institution
 Discipline
 Discipline and Punish
 Discontinuity (Postmodernism)
 Discordianism
 Discourse
 Discourse ethics
 Discourse on Inequality
 Discourse on Metaphysics
 Discourse on the Method
 Discourses of Epictetus
 Discovery (observation)
 Discrediting tactic
 Discrete time
 Discretion
 Discrimination
 Discursive dilemma
 Disgust
 Disjunction
 Disjunction elimination
 Disjunction introduction
 Disjunctive normal form
 Disjunctive syllogism
 Disjunctivism
 Dispositif
 Disposition
 Dispositional and occurrent belief
 Dispositional belief
 Dispute resolution organization
 Disquisitions relating to Matter and Spirit
 Disquotational principle
 Dissent
 Dissoi logoi
 Distancing effect
 Distinction (philosophy)
 Distinction without a difference
 Distribution of terms
 Distribution of wealth
 Distributism
 Distributive justice
 Divided line
 Divine apathy
 Divine command ethics
 Divine command theory
 Divine grace
 Divine illumination
 Divine philosophy
 Divine Providence
 Divine right of kings
 Divine simplicity
 Divinity
 Divorce
 Divyadaan: Salesian Institute of Philosophy, Nashik
 Djwal Khul
 Do-ol
 Do Androids Dream of Electric Sheep?
 Do it yourself
 Do not resuscitate
 Doctor-patient relationship
 Doctor Irrefragabilis
 Doctor Mirabilis
 Doctor of Philosophy
 Doctrine of internal relations
 Doctrine of mental reservation
 Doctrine of the Mean
 Dogen
 Dōgen
 Dogen Kigen
 Dōgen Kigen
 Dogma
 Dogmatism
 Dogmatists
 Dokkōdō
 Dolf Sternberger
 Dolpopa Sherab Gyaltsen
 Domain of discourse
 Domenico Losurdo
 Dominance
 Dominant ideology
 Dominate
 Dominator culture
 Domingo Báñez
 Domingo de Soto
 Dominicus Gundissalinus
 Dominik Gross
 Dominik Perler
 Dominion
 Dominique Lecourt
 Domninus of Larissa
 Don't-care (logic)
 Don't be evil
 Don't Just Vote, Get Active
 Don Ihde
 Donald A. Crosby
 Donald A. Gillies
 Donald A. Martin
 Donald Burt
 Donald D. Evans
 Donald Davidson (philosopher)
 Donald Rooum
 Donald T. Campbell
 Donald West Harward
 Dong Zhongshu
 Donkey pronoun
 Donkey sentence
 Donkey sentences
 Donna Dickenson
 Doomsday argument
 Doomsday cult
 Doomsday event
 Dora Marsden
 Dorothy Day
 Dorothy Edgington
 Dorothy Emmet
 Dorothy Maud Wrinch
 Dos Fraye Vort
 Dositej Obradović
 Dot notation
 Double-aspect theory
 Double-mindedness
 Double aspect theory
 Double consciousness
 Double counting (fallacy)
 Double effect
 Double negation
 Double negative
 Double negation elimination
 Double truth
 Double turnstile
 Doubt
 Douglas N. Walton
 Douglas Harding
 Douglas Hofstadter
 Dov Gabbay
 Down the River
 Doxa
 Doxastic attitudes
 Doxastic logic
 Doxography
 Dragoş Protopopescu
 Dramatism
 Dramatistic pentad
 Dravya
 Dravya (Jainism)
 Dread
 Dream argument
 Dream
 Drew Hyland
 Drinker paradox
 Dual-aspect theory
 Dual-attribute theory
 Dual consciousness
 Dual loyalty (ethics)
 Dual power
 Dualism (philosophy of mind)
 Dualistic cosmology
 Dualistic interactionism
 Duality of structure
 Duck test
 Dudley Knowles
 Due process
 Dugald Macpherson
 Dugald Stewart
 Duhem–Quine thesis
 Dukkha
 Dulce et decorum est pro patria mori
 Dumitru D. Roşca
 Dunamis
 Duncan Kennedy (legal philosopher)
 Duns Scotus
 Durandus of Saint-Pourçain
 Durandus of St Pourcain
 Durandus of St Pourçain
 Duration (Bergson)
 Durruti Column
 Durruti: The People Armed
 Dušan Pirjevec
 Dutch book
 Dutch book argument
 Duty
 Duty of care
 Duty of confidentiality
 Dvaita
 Dvaita Vedanta
 Dwelling
 Dwight H. Terry Lectureship
 Dyad (Greek philosophy)
 Dyadic
 Dyck language
 Dyer Lum
 Dylan Evans
 Dynamic logic
 Dynamics of the celestial spheres
 Dynamis
 Dynamism (metaphysics)
 Dysteleology
 Dystopia
 Dzogchen

E 

 E-freedom
 E. Antonio Romero
 E. David Cook
 E. I. Watkin
 Early Islamic philosophy
 Early life of Plato
 Early modern philosophy
 Earth immune system
 Earth jurisprudence
 Eastern epistemology
 Eastern Group of Painters
 Eastern philosophy
 Eastern philosophy and clinical psychology
 Ecce Homo (book)
 Echecrates
 Echographies of Television
 Eckart Schütrumpf
 Eclecticism
 Eco-criticism
 Eco-socialism
 Ecofascism
 Ecofeminism
 Ecological fallacy
 Ecology
 Ecology of contexts
 Economic analysis of law
 Economic and Philosophical Manuscripts of 1844
 Economic determinism
 Economic freedom
 Economic subjectivism
 Economics (Aristotle)
 Ecophagy
 Ecosharing
 Ecosophy
 Ecphantus the Pythagorean
 Écriture féminine
 Ecstasy (philosophy)
 Eddy Zemach
 Edgar A. Singer, Jr.
 Edgar Bauer
 Edgar Morin
 Edgar S. Brightman
 Edgar Zilsel
 Edifying Discourses in Diverse Spirits
 Edith Stein
 Edith Wyschogrod
 Edmund Bordeaux Szekely
 Edmund Burke
 Edmund Gettier
 Edmund Gurney
 Edmund Husserl
 Edouard Hugon
 Edouard Le Roy
 Edouard Louis Emmanuel Julien Le Roy
 Édouard Schuré
 Eduard Fimmen
 Eduard Hanslick
 Eduard Pons Prades
 Eduard Spranger
 Eduard von Hartmann
 Eduard Zeller
 Eduardo Carrasco
 Eduardo Nicol
 Eduardo Rabossi
 Education
 Educational essentialism
 Educational perennialism
 Educational progressivism
 Edvard Westermarck
 Edward Abramowski
 Edward Bullough
 Edward Caird
 Edward Dembowski
 Edward Fredkin
 Edward Grant
 Edward Herbert, 1st Baron Herbert of Cherbury
 Edward Jones-Imhotep
 Edward N. Zalta
 Edward Nelson
 Edward S. Reed
 Edward Said
 Edward Sapir
 Edward Stachura
 Edward Westermarck
 Edwin Arthur Burtt
 Edwin Holt
 Eero Loone
 Effective method
 Effective procedure
 Efficacious grace
 Efficient cause
 Effort heuristic
 Efodi
 Efrydiau Athronyddol
 Egalitarian community
 Egalitarian dialogue
 Egalitarianism
 Egalitarianism as a Revolt Against Nature and Other Essays
 Ego
 Egocentric bias
 Egocentric predicament
 Egocentrism
 Egoism
 Egoist anarchism
 Egolessness
 Egon Bondy
 Ehrenfried Walther von Tschirnhaus
 Ehud Hrushovski
 Eidetic reduction
 Eight Honors and Eight Shames
 Eightfold Path
 Eikasia
 Eino Kaila
 Einstein-Bohr debates
 Either/Or
 Ekam
 Ekpyrôsis
 El Sopar
 El Túnel
 Elaine Scarry
 Élan vital
 Elbert Hubbard
 Elbow Room (Dennett book)
 Eleatics
 Election
 Election promise
 Elective rights
 Electromagnetic theories of consciousness
 Elegance
 Elementary equivalence
 Elements of the Philosophy of Newton
 Elements of the Philosophy of Right
 Elenchus
 Elephant test
 Eleutherius Winance
 Eli Siegel
 Elia del Medigo
 Éliane Amado Levy-Valensi
 Elias (commentator)
 Elias Alsabti
 Élie Halévy
 Eliette Abécassis
 Elijah Ben Joseph Chabillo
 Elijah Delmedigo
 Elijah Millgram
 Eliminative materialism
 Eliminativism
 Eliot Deutsch
 Élisabeth Badinter
 Elisabeth Beck-Gernsheim
 Elisabeth Lloyd
 Elisabeth of Bohemia, Princess Palatine
 Élisée Reclus
 Elisionism
 Elitism
 Élitism
 ELIZA effect
 Elizabeth Burns (philosopher)
 Elizabeth Grosz
 Elliot N. Dorff
 Elliott Sober
 Ellipsis
 Ellopion of Peparethus
 Elme Marie Caro
 Elmer Sprague
 Emanationism
 Emanouil Dadaoglou
 Emanuel Lasker
 Emanuel Mendes da Costa
 Emanuel Rádl
 Emanuel Swedenborg
 Emanuele Severino
 Embodied cognition
 Embodied philosophy
 Embodiment
 Emergence
 Emergent materialism
 Emergent property
 Emergentism
 Emerich de Vattel
 Emersonian perfectionism
 Emic
 Emil Abderhalden
 Emil Brunner
 Emil Cioran
 Emil du Bois-Reymond
 Emil Du Bois-Reymond
 Emil Fackenheim
 Emil Lask
 Emil Leon Post
 Emil Ludwig Fackenheim
 Émile Boutroux
 Émile Bréhier
 Émile Chartier
 Emile Durkheim
 Émile Durkheim
 Émile Littré
 Emile Meyerson
 Émile Meyerson
 Émile Pouget
 Émile Saisset
 Emile: or, On Education
 Émilie du Châtelet
 Emilio Betti
 Emilio Oribe
 Emily Elizabeth Constance Jones
 Emma (play)
 Emma Goldman
 Emma Goldman: The Anarchist Guest
 Emmanuel Chukwudi Eze
 Emmanuel Levinas
 Emmanuel Mounier
 Emotion
 Emotional reasoning
 Emotions in decision making
 Emotive conjugation
 Emotivism
 Empathy
 Empedocles
 Empire style
 Empirical
 Empirical decision theory
 Empirical knowledge
 Empirical limits in science
 Empirical method
 Empirical probability
 Empirical relationship
 Empirical research
 Empiricism
 Emptiness
 Empty name
 Empty set
 Empty string
 En soi
 Enactivism (psychology)
 Enantiomorph
 Enchin
 Enchiridion of Epictetus
 Enclosed A
 Encyclopedia
 Encyclopedia of Ethics
 Encyclopedia of Philosophy
 Encyclopedia of the Brethren of Purity
 Encyclopedia of the Philosophical Sciences
 Encyclopedist
 End-of-life care
 End in itself
 End term
 Endgame (Derrick Jensen books)
 Ending Aging
 Endowment (philosophy)
 Endowment effect
 Endoxa
 Endurance
 Endurantism
 Energeia
 Energeticism
 Energy
 Enforcement
 Engineered language
 Engineering ethics
 England, England
 English philosophy
 English, August (novel)
 Enlightened absolutism
 Enlightened self-interest
 Enlightenment (spiritual)
 Enneads
 Ennin
 Enrico Ferri
 Enrique Dussel
 Enrique Flores Magón
 Enrique González Rojo, Jr.
 Enron Code of Ethics
 Entailment
 Entelechy
 Enthusiasm
 Enthymeme
 Entitative graph
 Entity
 Entity realism
 Entropy
 Entscheidungsproblem
 Enumerative definition
 Enumerative induction
 Envelope paradox
 Environmental ethics
 Environmental philosophy
 Environmental virtue ethics
 Environmentalism
 Envy
 Eo ipso
 Ephesian school
 Epic and Novel
 Epicharmus
 Epicharmus of Kos
 Epictetus
 Epicureanism
 Epicurus
 Epigenetics
 Epilogism
 Epimenides
 Epimenides paradox
 Epinomis
 Epiphenomenalism
 Epiphenomenon
 Episodes of the Cuban Revolutionary War
 Episteme
 Epistemic closure
 Epistemic commitment
 Epistemic community
 Epistemic conservatism
 Epistemic justification
 Epistemic logic
 Epistemic minimalism
 Epistemic modal logic
 Epistemic moods
 Epistemic possibility
 Epistemic probability
 Epistemic relativism
 Epistemic theories of truth
 Epistemic theory of miracles
 Epistemic virtue
 Epistemicism
 Epistemics
 Epistemocracy
 Epistemological anarchism
 Epistemological externalism
 Epistemological idealism
 Epistemological particularism
 Epistemological pluralism
 Epistemological problem of the indeterminacy of data to theory
 Epistemological realism
 Epistemological relativism
 Epistemological rupture
 Epistemological solipsism
 Epistemology
 Epistle to Yemen
 Epistles (Plato)
 Epistulae morales ad Lucilium
 Epoché
 Epochē
 Epsilon
 Epsilon calculus
 Equal consideration of interests
 Equality of opportunity
 Equality of sacrifice
 Equipollence
 Equipossible
 Equiprobable
 Equisatisfiability
 Equity
 Equity (economics)
 Equivalence
 Equivalence class
 Equivalence relation
 Equivocation
 Eranos
 Erasing rule
 Erasmus of Rotterdam
 Erastus of Scepsis
 Eratosthenes
 Erazim Kohák
 Eretrian school
 Ergatocracy
 Eric A. Havelock
 Eric Higgs (philosopher)
 Eric Lionel Mascall
 Eric McDavid
 Eric T. Olson (philosopher)
 Eric Voegelin
 Erich Adickes
 Erich Fromm
 Erich Heller
 Erich Jantsch
 Erich Mühsam
 Erich Rothacker
 Erich Unger
 Erik von Kuehnelt-Leddihn
 Eristic
 Erkenntnis
 Ernan McMullin
 Ernest Addison Moody
 Ernest Fenollosa
 Ernest Fortin
 Ernest Gellner
 Ernest Lepore
 Ernest Nagel
 Ernest Sosa
 Ernest Wamba dia Wamba
 Ernesto Buonaiuti
 Ernesto Garzón Valdés
 Ernesto Mayz Vallenilla
 Ernst Barthel
 Ernst Bergmann (philosopher)
 Ernst Bloch
 Ernst Cassirer
 Ernst Christian Gottlieb Reinhold
 Ernst Ehrlich
 Ernst Friedrich Apelt
 Ernst Gombrich
 Ernst Haeckel
 Ernst Heinrich Haeckel
 Ernst Jünger
 Ernst Kapp
 Ernst Laas
 Ernst Mach
 Ernst Mally
 Ernst Melzer
 Ernst Nolte
 Ernst Peter Wilhelm Troeltsch
 Ernst Platner
 Ernst Schröder
 Ernst Troeltsch
 Ernst Tugendhat
 Ernst von Glasersfeld
 Ernst W. Mayr
 Ernst Zermelo
 Eros (love)
 Eros and Civilization
 Eros and the Mysteries of Love
 Eros Plus Massacre
 Erotetics
 Erotic art
 Eroticism
 Errol Harris
 Error
 Error theory
 Ervin László
 Erwin Marquit
 Erwin Panofsky
 Erwin Rohde
 Erwin Schrödinger
 Eryxias (dialogue)
 Esa Saarinen
 Escapism
 Eschatology
 Escuela Moderna
 Esoteric
 Esoteric Christianity
 Especifismo
 Esperanza Guisán
 Essay on the Origin of Languages
 Essays (Francis Bacon)
 Essays (Montaigne)
 Essays in Radical Empiricism
 Essays on Philosophical Subjects
 Essays on Some Unsettled Questions of Political Economy
 Essays, Moral, Political, and Literary
 Esse est percipi
 Essence
 Essential Logic
 Essential property
 Essentialism
 Essentially contested concept
 Est Playing the Game
 Estanislao Zuleta
 Esther Meek
 Eternal Buddha
 Eternal recurrence
 Eternal return
 Eternal return (Eliade)
 Eternal statement
 Eternalism (philosophy of time)
 Eternity
 Eternity of the world
 Ethel MacDonald
 Ethic of reciprocity
 Ethica thomistica
 Ethical absolutism
 Ethical arguments regarding torture
 Ethical banking
 Ethical calculus
 Ethical code
 Ethical consumerism
 Ethical decision
 Ethical dilemma
 Ethical egoism
 Ethical extensionism
 Ethical formalism
 Ethical intuitionism
 Ethical issues of AI
 Ethical naturalism
 Ethical non-naturalism
 Ethical objectivism
 Ethical problems using children in clinical trials
 Ethical relationship
 Ethical relativism
 Ethical skepticism
 Ethical solipsism
 Ethical subjectivism
 Ethical will
 Ethicist
 Ethics
 Ethics
 Ethics (journal)
 Ethics (Spinoza)
 Ethics and evolutionary psychology
 Ethics and Language
 Ethics Bowl
 Ethics Commission
 Ethics in Government Act
 Ethics in pharmaceutical sales
 Ethics in religion
 Ethics in the Bible
 Ethics of artificial intelligence
 Ethics of care
 Ethics of cloning
 Ethics of eating meat
 Ethics of justice
 Ethics of technology
 Ethics of terraforming
 Ethiopian philosophy
 Ethnography
 Ethnology
 Ethnomethodology
 Ethology
 Ethos
 Etic
 Étienne Balibar
 Étienne Bonnot de Condillac
 Étienne Borne
 Étienne de La Boétie
 Étienne Gilson
 Étienne Souriau
 Étienne Tempier
 Étienne Vacherot
 Etienne Vermeersch
 Etiology
 Etiquette
 Etymological fallacy
 Etymology of War on Terrorism
 Euaeon of Lampsacus
 Eubulides
 Eubulides of Miletus
 Eubulus (banker)
 Euclid
 Euclid of Megara
 Euclidean geometry
 Eudaimonia
 Eudaimonism
 Eudemian Ethics
 Eudemus of Rhodes
 Eudorus of Alexandria
 Eudoxus of Cnidus
 Euenus
 Eufrosin Poteca
 Eugen Duhring
 Eugen Dühring
 Eugen Fink
 Eugen Herrigel
 Eugen Karl Duhring
 Eugen Karl Dühring
 Eugen Rosenstock-Huessy
 Eugene Gendlin
 Eugene Kamenka
 Eugenics
 Eugenio Garin
 Eugenios Voulgaris
 Euhemerus
 Euler diagram
 Eunoia
 Euphantus
 Euphraeus
 Euphrates the Stoic
 Eupraxis
 Eureka: A Prose Poem
 Eurocommunism
 European Journal of Philosophy
 European Journal of Political Theory
 European Society for Philosophy and Psychology
 European Summer School in Logic, Language and Information
 Eurytus (Pythagorean)
 Eusebius of Caesarea
 Eusebius of Myndus
 Eusociality
 Eustathius of Cappadocia
 Eustratius of Nicaea
 Euthanasia
 Euthanasia in the Netherlands
 Euthanasia in the United States
 Euthenics
 Euthydemos
 Euthydemus (dialogue)
 Euthymia (philosophy)
 Euthymius of Athos
 Euthyphro
 Euthyphro dilemma
 Eutrapelia
 Eval'd Vasil'evich Il'enkov
 Evald Ilyenkov
 Evald Vassilievich Ilyenkov
 Evaluation
 Evan Thompson
 Evander (philosopher)
 Evander Bradley McGilvary
 Evangelical Philosophical Society
 Evasion (book)
 Evasion (ethics)
 Eve Kosofsky Sedgwick
 Evelyn Fox Keller
 Event (philosophy)
 Everard Digby (scholar)
 Everard of Ypres
 Everlasting
 Evert Willem Beth
 Everything
 Everything which is not forbidden is allowed
 Evidence
 Evidence of absence
 Evidential existentiality
 Evidential reason
 Evidentialism
 Evil
 Evil daemon
 Evil demon
 Evolution
 Evolution and ethics
 Evolution of morality
 Evolutionary argument against naturalism
 Evolutionary epistemology
 Evolutionary ethic
 Evolutionary ethics
 Evolutionary game theory
 Evolutionary Humanism
 Evolutionary psychology
 Evolutionary psychology of religion
 Ex nihilo
 Examen philosophicum
 Examined Life
 Exceptionalism
 Exchange value
 Excluded middle
 Exclusion principle (philosophy)
 Exclusive disjunction
 Exclusive or
 Exclusivism
 Excuse
 Exegesis
 Exemplification
 Exemplification theory
 Exile and the Kingdom
 Existence
 Existence of God
 Existence precedes essence
 Existence theorem
 Existential crisis
 Existential fallacy
 Existential graph
 Existential humanism
 Existential import
 Existential phenomenology
 Existential proposition
 Existential quantification
 Existential quantifier
 Existential therapy
 Existentialism
 Existentialist ethics
 Existentialist feminism
 Existentialists
 Existentiell
 Exoteric
 Exotheology
 Exoticism
 Expanded Criteria Donor
 Expect Resistance
 Expected return
 Expected utility
 Experience
 Experience (Emerson)
 Experiential knowledge
 Experientialism
 Experiment
 Experimental philosophy
 Experimenter's bias
 Experiments in Ethics
 Explanandum
 Explanans
 Explanation
 Explanatory gap
 Explanatory power
 Explication
 Exploitation
 Exploitation theory
 Exploratory engineering
 Exploring Reality
 Explosion in a Cathedral
 Exportation
 Expression
 Expressivism
 Extended Affix Grammar
 Extended Backus–Naur Form
 Extended consciousness
 Extended mind thesis
 Extension (metaphysics)
 Extension (semantics)
 Extensional context
 Extensional definition
 Extensionality
 Externalism
 Externalization
 Externism
 Exteroception
 Extrication morality
 Extrinsic finality
 Extrinsic property
 Extrinsic value (ethics)
 Eyewitness testimony

F 

 F. C. S. Schiller
 F. H. Bradley
 F. M. Cornford
 F. S. C. Northrop
 Fa-Tsang
 Fabrice Hadjadj
 Face-to-face
 Facial symmetry
 Fact
 Fact-value dichotomy
 Fact-value distinction
 Fact, Fiction, and Forecast
 Facticity
 Factor T
 Faculty of Philosophy, Cambridge
 Faculty of Philosophy, University of Oxford
 Faculty psychology
 Fahrenheit 451
 Fair value
 Faith
 Faith and rationality
 Faith, Science and Understanding
 Fakhr-al-Din Iraqi
 Fakhr al-Din al-Razi
 Fallacies
 Fallacies of definition
 Fallacy
 Fallacy of accident
 Fallacy of affirming the consequent
 Fallacy of composition
 Fallacy of denying the antecedent
 Fallacy of distribution
 Fallacy of division
 Fallacy of equivocation
 Fallacy of exclusive premises
 Fallacy of false cause
 Fallacy of four terms
 Fallacy of hasty generalization
 Fallacy of irrelevant conclusion
 Fallacy of many questions
 Fallacy of misplaced concreteness
 Fallacy of necessity
 Fallacy of quoting out of context
 Fallacy of secundum quid
 Fallacy of the single cause
 Fallacy of the undistributed middle
 Fallibilism
 Falsafatuna
 False analogy
 False attribution
 False cause
 False consciousness
 False consensus effect
 False dilemma
 False premise
 False statement
 Falsifiability
 Falsum
 Familiarity heuristic
 Family as a model for the state
 Family resemblance
 Family values
 Famine, Affluence, and Morality
 Fan Zhen
 Fanaticism
 Fanya Baron
 Faraday Institute for Science and Religion
 Fascism
 Fascism and ideology
 Fascist manifesto
 Fascist symbolism
 Fatalism
 Fate of the unlearned
 Fatemeh Is Fatemeh
 Fathers and Sons
 Faulty generalization
 Faustus Socinus
 Fauvism
 Faux frais of production
 Favorinus
 Fazang
 Fazlur Rahman Malik
 Fear
 Fear and Trembling
 Fechner's law
 Federação Anarquista Gaúcha
 Federación Anarquista Ibérica
 Federación Ibérica de Juventudes Libertarias
 Federacja Anarchistyczna
 Federal republicanism
 Federalism
 Federalist
 Federation of Anarchist Communists
 Federica Montseny
 Federico Cesi
 Federico Riu
 Fedir Shchus
 Fedor Mikhailovich Dostoevskii
 Fëdor Mikhailovich Dostoevskii
 Feedback
 Feedforward
 Feeling
 Felicific calculus
 Felicity conditions
 Feliks Jaroński
 Feliks Koneczny
 Félix Guattari
 Felix Kaufmann
 Felix Ravaisson
 Félix Ravaisson
 Félix Ravaisson-Mollien
 Felix Weltsch
 Feminism
 Feminist art movement
 Feminist epistemology
 Feminist existentialism
 Feminist jurisprudence
 Feminist legal theory
 Feminist literary criticism
 Feminist philosophy
 Feminist theology
 Feminist theory
 Feng Youlan
 Fenomenologia dell'Individuo Assoluto
 Ferdinand Alquié
 Ferdinand de Saussure
 Ferdinand Ebner
 Ferdinand Gotthelf Hand
 Ferdinand Lassalle
 Ferdinand Tönnies
 Fergus Gordon Kerr
 Ferid Muhić
 Fermat's Last Theorem
 Fermin Rocker
 Fermín Salvochea
 Fernand Brunner
 Fernand Dumont
 Fernando González (writer)
 Fernando Ocariz
 Fernando Rielo
 Fernando Savater
 Ferruccio Busoni
 Fertilization in vitro
 Fetter (Buddhism)
 Fi Zilal al-Qur'an
 Fiction
 Failure to refer
 Fictionalism
 Fideism
 Fidel Manrique
 Fidelity
 Field theory
 Fields of Force
 Fields, Factories and Workshops
 Fifth Estate (periodical)
 Fifth Letter (Plato)
 Figuration Libre
 Figure and ground
 Filial piety
 Filipino values
 Filippo Turati
 Final cause
 Final causes
 Finance capitalism
 Fine art
 Finite automaton
 Finitism
 Fiqh
 Fire
 Firmin Abauzit
 First-in-man study
 First-order logic
 First-order predicate
 First-order predicate calculus
 First-person perspective
 First Alcibiades
 First cause
 First cause argument
 First law of thermodynamics
 First Letter (Plato)
 First mover
 First of May Group
 First philosophy
 First principle
 Firstness
 Fiscal conservatism
 Fitch's paradox
 Fitch's paradox of knowability
 Fitness (biology)
 Five hindrances
 Five phases
 Five Precepts
 Five Virtues
 Five Ways
 Five wits
 Flaccid designator
 Flesh
 Flipism
 Florencio Sánchez
 Florentine School
 Florian Znaniecki
 Flow My Tears, the Policeman Said
 Fluency heuristic
 Fluent (artificial intelligence)
 Fluent calculus
 Fluid Concepts and Creative Analogies
 Fluxion
 Fluxus
 Flying arrow paradox
 Folk psychology
 Fooled by Randomness
 For-itself
 For a New Liberty
 For Self-Examination
 For the children (politics)
 For the New Intellectual
 Force
 Forces and Fields
 Foreknowledge (disambiguation)
 Forgery
 Forgive and Forget: Healing the Hurts We Don't Deserve
 Forgiveness
 Form follows function
 Form of government
 Form of life
 Form of life (philosophy)
 Form of the Good
 Formal cause
 Formal distinction
 Formal epistemology
 Formal ethics
 Formal fallacy
 Formal language
 Formal logic
 Formal ontology
 Formal semantics (logic)
 Formal theorem
 Formalesque
 Formalism (art)
 Formalism (mathematics)
 Formalism (philosophy)
 Formalization
 Formation rule
 Formula
 Formulation (logic)
 Forward chaining
 Foucault–Habermas debate
 Found object
 Foundation axiom
 Foundation ontology
 Foundationalism
 Foundations of Christianity
 Foundations of mathematics
 Foundations of Natural Right
 Foundherentism
 Four-dimensionalism
 Four Books
 Four causes
 Four Dissertations
 Four elements
 Four Freedoms
 Four humors
 Four Noble Truths
 Four stages of enlightenment
 Fourier complex
 Fourteen unanswerable questions
 Fourth Way (book)
 Fragmentalism
 Fragments of an Anarchist Anthropology
 Frame of Government of Pennsylvania
 Frame problem
 Frame problem (philosophy)
 Framing (social sciences)
 Frances Kamm
 Francesc Ferrer i Guàrdia
 Francesc Pujols
 Francesc Sabaté Llopart
 Francesco Acri
 Francesco Algarotti
 Francesco D'Andrea
 Francesco de Sanctis
 Francesco Filelfo
 Francesco Patrizi da Cherso
 Francesco Patrizzi
 Francesco Petrarca
 Francesco Saverio Merlino
 Francesco Silvestri
 Francesco Vimercato
 Francis Anderson (philosopher)
 Francis Bacon
 Francis Fukuyama
 Francis Hutcheson (philosopher)
 Francis J. Beckwith
 Francis of Assisi
 Francis of Marchia
 Francis of Mayrone
 Francis of Meyronnes
 Francis Parker Yockey
 Francis Robortello
 Francis Schaeffer
 Francisco Ascaso
 Francisco de Vitoria
 Francisco Giner de los Ríos
 Francisco J. Ayala
 Francisco Miró Quesada Cantuarias
 Francisco Romero (philosopher)
 Francisco Sanches
 Francisco Suarez
 Francisco Suárez
 Francisco Varela
 Francisco Zumel
 Franciscus Bonae Spei
 Franciscus Mercurius van Helmont
 Franciscus Patricius
 Franciscus Patritius
 Franciscus Toletus
 Francisque Bouillier
 Franciszek Fiszer
 Franciszek Krupiński
 Franco Bolelli
 Franco Burgersdijk
 François Bernier
 François Châtelet
 François de Salignac de la Mothe-Fénelon
 Francois de Salignac de la Mothe Fenelon
 François de Salignac de la Mothe Fénelon
 François du Souhait
 François Hemsterhuis
 François Laruelle
 François Picavet
 François Pillon
 François Poullain de la Barre
 François Rabelais
 François Wahl
 Françoise Gaillard
 Françoise Meltzer
 Franjo Marković
 Frank Ankersmit
 Frank Cameron Jackson
 Frank Ebersole
 Frank Fernández
 Frank Knopfelmacher
 Frank Meyer (political philosopher)
 Frank P. Ramsey
 Frank Plumpton Ramsey
 Frank R. Wallace
 Frank Sibley (philosopher)
 Frank Van Dun
 Frankfurt counterexamples
 Frankfurt School
 Franklin I. Gamwell
 Franklin Merrell-Wolff
 Frantz Fanon
 Franz Brentano
 Franz Jakob Clemens
 Franz Joseph Gall
 Franz Rosenzweig
 Franz Xaver Schmid
 Franz Xaver von Baader
 Fred Dretske
 Fred Feldman (philosopher)
 Fred I. Dretske
 Fred Miller (philosopher)
 Fred Newman (philosopher)
 Frederick C. Beiser
 Frederick Copleston
 Frederick Ferré
 Frederick James Eugene Woodbridge
 Frederick Neuhouser
 Frederick Sontag
 Frederick Suppe
 Frederick Wilhelmsen
 Frederik Christian Eilschov
 Fredric Jameson
 Fredy Perlman
 Free-market anarchism
 Free Boolean algebra
 Free logic
 Free Play (Derrida)
 Free Society
 Free to Choose
 Free variables and bound variables
 Free will
 Free Workers' Union
 Free Workers' Union of Germany
 Freedom (British newspaper)
 Freedom and Culture
 Freedom and the Law
 Freedom Defence Committee
 Freedom Evolves
 Freedom of contract
 Freedom of speech
 Freedom Press
 Freedom versus license
 Freethought
 Frege's Puzzle
 Frege's theorem
 Frege-Geach point
 Frege-Geach problem
 Frege–Church ontology
 Freie Arbeiter Stimme
 French law on secularity and conspicuous religious symbols in schools
 French materialism
 French philosophy
 French Pragmatism
 French structuralist feminism
 French Theory
 Freudo-Marxism
 Freya Mathews
 Friederich Augustus Rauch
 Friedrich Adolf Trendelenburg
 Friedrich Albert Lange
 Friedrich August von Hayek
 Friedrich Bernhard Ferdinand Michelis
 Friedrich Calker
 Friedrich Christian Baumeister
 Friedrich Eduard Beneke
 Friedrich Engels
 Friedrich Groos
 Friedrich Harms
 Friedrich Heinrich Jacobi
 Friedrich Hölderlin
 Friedrich Immanuel Niethammer
 Friedrich Kambartel
 Friedrich Karl Forberg
 Friedrich Carl von Savigny
 Friedrich Meinecke
 Friedrich Nietzsche
 Friedrich Nietzsche bibliography
 Friedrich Paulsen
 Friedrich Pollock
 Friedrich Schiller
 Friedrich Schlegel
 Friedrich Schleiermacher
 Friedrich Solmsen
 Friedrich Theodor Vischer
 Friedrich Ulfers
 Friedrich von Hardenberg
 Friedrich von Hayek
 Friedrich von Hügel
 Friedrich von Schlegel
 Friedrich Waismann
 Friedrich Waissman
 Friedrich Wilhelm Joseph Schelling
 Friedrich Wilhelm Joseph von Schelling
 Friedrich Wilhelm Nietzsche
 Friends of Durruti Group
 Friends, Lovers, Chocolate
 Friendship
 Fringe science
 Frithjof Bergmann
 Frithjof Schuon
 Fritjof Capra
 Fritz Heinemann
 Fritz Mauthner
 From Bakunin to Lacan
 From each according to his ability, to each according to his need
 Führerprinzip
 Fujiwara Seika
 Function and Concept
 Functional calculus
 Functional completeness
 Functional contextualism
 Functional decomposition
 Functionalism (philosophy of mind)
 Functor
 Fundamental attribution error
 Fundamental ontology
 Fundamental rights
 Fundamental science
 Fundamentalism
 Fung Yu-lan
 Funk art
 Fusion of horizons
 Fusionism (politics)
 Futa Helu
 Future
 Future contingents
 Future Primitive and Other Essays
 Futurism
 Fuzzy concept
 Fuzzy logic
 Fuzzy set
 Fyodor Dostoyevsky
 Fyodor Shcherbatskoy

G 

 G. A. den Hartogh
 G. E. L. Owen
 G. E. M. Anscombe
 G. E. Moore
 G. F. B. Riemann
 G. H. von Wright
 G. I. Gurdjieff
 G.E. Moore
 G.E.L. Owen
 G.H. von Wright
 Gabbay's separation theorem
 Gabino Barreda
 Gabriel's Wing
 Gabriel Biel
 Gabriel Bonnot de Mably
 Gabriel Jean Edmond Séailles
 Gabriel Liiceanu
 Gabriel Marcel
 Gabriel Nuchelmans
 Gabrielle Suchon
 Gadadhara
 Gaetano Bresci
 Gaetano Mosca
 Gaetano Sanseverino
 Gaia Hypothesis
 Gaia philosophy
 Gaisi Takeuti
 Gaius (jurist)
 Gaius Marius Victorinus
 Gaius Musonius Rufus
 Gaius the Platonist
 Gajo Petrović
 Galen
 Galen Strawson
 Galenic corpus
 Galileo
 Galileo Galilei
 Galvano Della Volpe
 Gambler's fallacy
 Game semantics
 Game theory
 GANDALF trial
 Gangesa
 Gangeśa
 Gangesha Upadhyaya
 Gani Bobi
 Gaozi
 Gareth Evans (philosopher)
 Gareth Matthews
 Gargi Vachaknavi
 Garlandus Compotista
 Garrett Hardin
 Garry L. Hagberg
 Gary Chartier
 Gary Drescher
 Gary Habermas
 Gary L. Francione
 Gary Legenhausen
 Gasparinus de Bergamo
 Gaston Bachelard
 Gaston Berger
 Gaudapada
 Gaudiya Vaisnava
 Gaunilo of Marmoutiers
 Gautama Buddha
 Gavagai
 Gavin Swarteztuber
 Gay Left
 Gayatri Chakravorty Spivak
 Gaze
 GCH
 Ge Hong
 Geist
 Geisteswissenschaften
 Gellish
 Gellish English
 Gemeinschaft
 Gemeinschaft and Gesellschaft
 Geminus
 Gemistus Pletho
 Gender
 Gender studies
 Gender theory
 Gene therapy
 Genealogy
 Genealogy (philosophy)
 General Confederation of Labour (Portugal)
 General intellect
 General relativity
 General semantics
 General systems theory
 General will
 Generalizability
 Generalization
 Generalization (logic)
 Generalized continuum hypothesis
 Generalized quantifier
 Generalized quantifiers
 Generalized star height problem
 Generation effect
 Generation of Animals
 Generative grammar
 Generativity
 Generosity
 Genetic epistemology
 Genetic fallacy
 Genetics
 Genetics and abortion
 Geneviève Fraisse
 Genevieve Lloyd
 Genidentity
 Genius
 Genocide
 Genotype–phenotype distinction
 Genshin
 Gentleness
 Genus
 Genus–differentia definition
 Geocriticism
 Geoffrey Bennington
 Geoffrey Brennan
 Geoffrey Hellman
 Geoffrey Hunter (logician)
 Geoffrey J. Warnock
 Geoffrey Ostergaard
 Geoffrey Reginald Gilchrist Mure
 Geoffrey Sayre-McCord
 Geoffrey Scarre
 Geoffrey Warnock
 Geographic determinism
 Geohumoral theory
 Geometry
 Geometry of interaction
 Georg Anton Friedrich Ast
 Georg Bernhard Bilfinger
 Georg Brandes
 Georg Cantor
 Georg Christoph Lichtenberg
 Georg Friedrich Daumer
 Georg Friedrich Meier
 Georg Gottlob Richter
 Georg Gustav Fulleborn
 Georg Henrik von Wright
 Georg Jellinek
 Georg Klaus
 Georg Kreisel
 Georg Kühlewind
 Georg Lukács
 Georg Mehlis
 Georg Misch
 Georg Simmel
 Georg Wilhelm Friedrich Hegel
 Georg Wilhelm Friedrich Hegel bibliography
 George Amiroutzes
 George Berkeley
 George Blewett
 George Boas
 George Boole
 George Boolos
 George Botterill
 George Caffentzis
 George Campbell (Presbyterian minister)
 George Croom Robertson
 George Dickie (philosopher)
 George Edward Hughes
 George Edward Moore
 George Eliot
 George Frederick Stout
 George Grant (philosopher)
 George Grote
 George H. Smith
 George Henry Lewes
 George Herbert Mead
 George Holland Sabine
 George Holmes Howison
 George Hourani
 George I. Mavrodes
 George Kateb
 George Lakoff
 George Lansing Raymond
 George Molnar (philosopher)
 George of Trebizond
 George Ohsawa
 George Orwell
 George Pappas
 George Santayana
 George Sher
 George Sossenko
 George Stout
 George Stuart Fullerton
 George Sylvester Morris
 George Trumbull Ladd
 George Turnbull (theologian)
 George Woodcock
 Georges-Louis Leclerc, Comte de Buffon
 Georges Bataille
 Georges Bénézé
 Georges Canguilhem
 Georges Cochon
 Georges Florovsky
 Georges Ohsawa
 Georges Palante
 Georges Politzer
 Georges Sorel
 Georgi Plekhanov
 Georgy Valentinovich Plekhanov
 Gerald Cohen
 Gerald Dworkin
 Gerald Holton
 Gerald Sacks
 Gerard Casey (philosopher)
 Gérard Granel
 Gerard of Abbeville
 Gerard of Bologna
 Gerard of Brussels
 Gerard of Cremona
 Gerard of Odo
 Gerard Verschuuren
 Gerardus Heymans
 Gerardus Johannes Petrus Josephus Bolland
 Gerardus Odonis
 Gerardus van der Leeuw
 Géraud de Cordemoy
 Gerbert of Aurillac
 Gerd Buchdahl
 Gerda Alexander
 Gerhard Dorn
 Gerhard Gentzen
 Gerhard Karl Erich Gentzen
 Gerhard Schneemann
 Gerhard Streminger
 Gerhard Vollmer
 Gerhold K. Becker
 Germain Grisez
 German Historical School
 German idealism
 German philosophy
 German Philosophy
 German Waldheim Cemetery
 Germinal (journal)
 Germinal (novel)
 Germinal choice technology
 Gerolamo Cardano
 Gerrit Mannoury
 Gershom Carmichael
 Gersonides
 Gertrud (novel)
 Gesellschaft
 Geshe Thupten Jinpa
 Gestalt
 Gestalt psychology
 Gestalt theory
 Gestell
 Gettier-style example
 Gettier problem
 Gettier problems
 Géza Fodor (philosopher)
 Ghosha
 Ghost in the machine
 Ghost in the machine (philosophy)
 Giacomo Leopardi
 Giacomo Marramao
 Giambattista Vico
 Giammaria Ortes
 Gian-Carlo Rota
 Gian Domenico Romagnosi
 Giancinto Sigismondo Gerdil
 Gianfranco Sanguinetti
 Gianni Vattimo
 Gifford Lectures
 Gift from Hijaz
 Gila Sher
 Gilbert de la Porrée
 Gilbert Harman
 Gilbert Hottois
 Gilbert Jack
 Gilbert of Poitiers
 Gilbert Ryle
 Gilbert Simondon
 Giles Fraser
 Giles of Lessines
 Giles of Rome
 Gilles-Gaston Granger
 Gilles Deleuze
 Gilles Lipovetsky
 Gillian Rose
 Gillick competence
 Gino Lucetti
 Gioacchino Ventura di Raulica
 Giordano Bruno
 Giordano Bruno and the Hermetic Tradition
 Giorgi Japaridze
 Giorgio Agamben
 Giorgio Colli
 Giorgio de Santillana
 Giorgio Del Vecchio
 Giorgio Vasari
 Giovanna Borradori
 Giovanni Baldelli
 Giovanni Botero
 Giovanni Filoteo Achillini
 Giovanni Francesco Pico della Mirandola
 Giovanni Gentile
 Giovanni Piana
 Giovanni Pico della Mirandola
 Giovanni Vailati
 Gisela Striker
 Giulio Camillo
 Giulio Cesare la Galla
 Giulio Cesare Vanini
 Giuseppa Eleonora Barbapiccola
 Giuseppe Ferrari
 Giuseppe Peano
 Giuseppe Pecci
 Giuseppe Tarantino
 Giuseppe Zangara
 Giuseppe Zevola
 Give-away shop
 Giwi Margwelaschwili
 Glas (book)
 Glaucon
 Gleason's theorem
 Glen Newey
 Glenn Albrecht
 Gli Asolani
 Glivenko's theorem
 Global citizens movement
 Global feminism
 Global justice
 Global Workspace Theory
 Globalization
 Gloria Origgi
 Glossary of philosophy
 Glossary of Stoic terms
 Gluttony
 Gnaeus Claudius Severus
 Gnaeus Claudius Severus Arabianus
 Gnomic wisdom
 Gnoseology
 Gnosiology
 Gnosticism
 God
 God-Building
 God and Other Minds
 God in Buddhism
 God is dead
 God Is Not Great
 God of the gaps
 God, A Guide for the Perplexed
 Goddess of the Market
 Godehard Link
 Gödel's incompleteness theorems
 Gödel's ontological proof
 Gödel's theorems
 Gödel numbering
 Gödel, Escher, Bach
 Godfrey of Fontaines
 Goethean science
 Gojiro
 Goldbach's conjecture
 Golden Eurydice Award
 Golden mean (philosophy)
 Golos Truda
 Gómez Pereira
 Gongsun Long
 Gonsalvus of Spain
 Gonzalo Arango
 Gonzalo Rodríguez Pereyra
 Good and evil
 Good and necessary consequence
 Good reasons approach
 Good will
 Goodman's paradox
 Goodness
 Goodness and value theory
 Gopal Balakrishnan
 Gopinath Kaviraj
 Gordon Anderson (author)
 Gordon Park Baker
 Gorgias
 Gorgias (dialogue)
 Gotama
 Gottfried Leibniz
 Gottfried Wilhelm Leibniz
 Gotthard Günther
 Gotthilf Heinrich von Schubert
 Gotthold Ephraim Lessing
 Gottlob Ernst Schulze
 Gottlob Frege
 Governance
 Government
 Governmentality
 Govinda Chandra Dev
 Grace de Laguna
 Grace Jantzen
 Graham Harman
 Graham Oppy
 Graham Priest
 Grammar
 Grammar of Assent
 Grammatical subject
 Grammaticality intuitions
 Grammatology
 Grandfather paradox
 Granny Made me an Anarchist
 Grant Cornwell
 Grassroots democracy
 Graswurzelrevolution
 Gravitas
 Gray Dorsey
 Great chain of being
 Great Learning
 Great Man theory
 Great Man theory of history
 Great unity
 Great Year
 Greatest good
 Greatest happiness principle
 Greed
 Greedy reductionism
 Greek hero cult
 Greek philosophy
 Green anarchism
 Green Anarchist
 Green Anarchy
 Green libertarianism
 Green syndicalism
 Greg Koukl
 Gregor Mendel
 Gregor Reisch
 Gregory Bateson
 Gregory Chaitin
 Gregory Currie
 Gregory I
 Gregory of Nyssa
 Gregory of Rimini
 Gregory Pence
 Gregory the Great
 Gregory Vlastos
 Gregory Wheeler
 Greibach normal form
 Grelling's paradox
 Grelling–Nelson paradox
 Grellings paradox
 Gricean maxims
 Griffith Powell
 Grigorii Maksimov
 Grigorii Nikolayevich Vyrubov
 Gross national happiness
 Grotesque
 Grotesque body
 Groundhog Day (film)
 Groundwork of the Metaphysic of Morals
 Group-serving bias
 Group entity
 Growing block universe
 Growth attenuation
 Grue and bleen
 Grundnorm
 Grundrisse
 Grzegorz of Stawiszyn
 Gu Yanwu
 Gu Zhun
 Guan Zhong
 Guanzi (text)
 Guarino da Verona
 Gudo Wafu Nishijima
 Guerrilla ontology
 Guerrilla punk
 Guevarism
 Guido del Giudice
 Guido Terrena
 Guidobaldo del Monte
 Guifeng Zongmi
 Guiguzi
 Guillaume du Vair
 Guillaume Lamy
 Guillaume Pierre Godin
 Guilt
 Guilty pleasure
 Guise
 Gulliver's Travels
 Gumersindo de Azcárate
 Gunk (mereology)
 Gunnar Landtman
 Gunnar Skirbekk
 Günter Abel
 Günther Anders
 Gunther Stent
 Guo Xiang
 Guru
 Guru Nanak Dev
 Gustav Bergmann
 Gustav Glogau
 Gustav Gustavovich Shpet
 Gustav Kafka
 Gustav Landauer
 Gustav Naan
 Gustav Radbruch
 Gustav Teichmuller
 Gustav Teichmüller
 Gustav Theodor Fechner
 Gustave Bouvet
 Gustave de Molinari
 Gustave Lefrançais
 Gustavo Bueno
 Gustavo Rol
 Guy Aldred
 Guy Debord
 Gwil Owen
 Gwilyn Ellis Lane Owen
 Gymnosophists
 Gymnosophy
 György Bence
 György Lukács
 György Márkus

H 

 H. B. Acton
 H. H. Price
 H. L. A. Hart
 H. L. Mencken
 H. P. Grice
 H. Paul Grice
 H. Richard Niebuhr
 H. Tristram Engelhardt, Jr.
 H.H. Price
 H.L.A. Hart
 Ha Ki-Rak
 Habeas corpus
 Habituation
 Habitus (sociology)
 Hacklab
 Haecceity
 Hagakure
 Hagnon of Tarsus
 Hajime Tanabe
 Hakim Bey
 Hakuin Ekaku
 Halakhah
 Halcyon (dialogue)
 Half-truth
 Halim
 Hallucination
 Hallucinations in the sane
 Halo effect
 Halting problem
 Hamid al-Din al-Kirmani
 Hamid Dabashi
 Han Fei
 Han Fei-tzu
 Han Ryner
 Han Yong-un
 Han Yu
 Handbook of Automated Reasoning
 Handwaving
 Hanna Al-Fakhoury
 Hannah Arendt
 Hans-Georg Gadamer
 Hans-Joachim Niemann
 Hans-Martin Sass
 Hans-Werner Bothe
 Hans Achterhuis
 Hans Adolf Eduard Driesch
 Hans Albert
 Hans Blom
 Hans Blumenberg
 Hans Cornelius
 Hans Ehrenberg
 Hans Frei
 Hans Freyer
 Hans Hahn
 Hans Jonas
 Hans Kamp
 Hans Kelsen
 Hans Köchler
 Hans Lipps
 Hans Pfitzner
 Hans Reichenbach
 Hans Robert Jauss
 Hans Rookmaaker
 Hans Skjervheim
 Hans Sluga
 Hans Vaihinger
 Hao Wang (academic)
 Happiness
 Happiness economics
 Har Dayal
 Harald Hoffding
 Harald Høffding
 Harald K. Schjelderup
 Harbinger (zine)
 Hard determinism
 Hard problem of consciousness
 Haribhadra
 Haridas Chaudhuri
 Harlem Renaissance
 Harm principle
 Harm reduction
 Harmonices Mundi
 Harmonious society
 Harmony
 Harmony of the spheres
 Harold Arthur Prichard
 Harold F. Cherniss
 Harold Foster Hallett
 Harold H. Thompson (anarchist)
 Harold Joachim
 Harriet Martineau
 Harriet Mill
 Harriet Taylor
 Harriet Taylor Mill
 Harry Austryn Wolfson
 Harry Binswanger
 Harry Frankfurt
 Harry Kelly (anarchist)
 Harry Oldmeadow
 Harry Prosch
 Hartley Burr Alexander
 Hartley Rogers, Jr.
 Hartry Field
 Hartry H. Field
 Harvey Brown (philosopher)
 Harvey Friedman
 Hasan Özbekhan
 Hasdai Crescas
 Hasdai ibn Crescas
 Hasdai Ibn Crescas
 Hasidic philosophy
 Hasidism
 Haskell Curry
 Hassan Hanafi
 Hassan Kobeissi
 Hastings Rashdall
 Hasty generalization
 Hatata
 Hate speech
 Hauntology
 Hayashi Hōkō
 Hayashi Razan
 Hayashi Ryūkō
 Haymarket affair
 Hayom Yom
 Hayy ibn Yaqdhan
 Hazel Barnes
 Health care proxy
 Heap paradox
 Heart
 Heathian anarchism
 Heaven
 Heaven and Hell (essay)
 Hecataeus of Abdera
 Hecato of Rhodes
 Hector-Neri Castañeda
 Hector Boece
 Hector Zagal
 Hedgehog's dilemma
 Hedone
 Hedonic calculus
 Hedonic treadmill
 Hedonism
 Hedwig Conrad-Martius
 Hegel-Archiv
 Hegel Society of America
 Hegel Society of Great Britain
 Hegelianism
 Hegelians
 Hegemony
 Hegemony and Socialist Strategy
 Hegesias of Cyrene
 Hegesias of Magnesia
 Hegesinus of Pergamon
 Hegias
 Heidegger and Nazism
 Heidegger Gesamtausgabe
 Heideggerian terminology
 Heidelberg School
 Heidi Ravven
 Heimin Shimbun
 Heinrich Christoph Wilhelm Sigwart
 Heinrich Cornelius Agrippa
 Heinrich Czolbe
 Heinrich Gomperz
 Heinrich Gustav Hotho
 Heinrich Hertz
 Heinrich Moritz Chalybäus
 Heinrich Rickert
 Heinrich Ritter
 Heinrich Rudolf Hertz
 Heinrich Seuse
 Heinrich von Kleist
 Heinz Cassirer
 Heinz dilemma
 Heinz Heimsoeth
 Heisenberg indeterminacy principle
 Heisenberg uncertainty principle
 HeLa
 Helen Longino
 Helen Lynd
 Helen Zimmern
 Helena Rasiowa
 Hélène Cixous
 Helene von Druskowitz
 Helga Kuhse
 Helio Gallardo
 Heliodoro de Paiva
 Heliodorus (philosopher)
 Heliodorus of Alexandria
 Hell
 Hellenistic philosophy
 Hellenistic philosophy and Christianity
 Helmut Reichelt
 Helmut Richard Niebuhr
 Helmut Thielicke
 Helmuth Plessner
 Helpfulness
 Helvidius Priscus
 Hempel's Dilemma
 Hempel-Oppenheim model
 Hendrik G. Stoker
 Hendrik Hart
 Hendrik van Eikema Hommes
 Hendrik van Riessen
 Henk Barendregt
 Henology
 Henosis
 Henotheism
 Henri-Frédéric Amiel
 Henri Bergson
 Henri Berr
 Henri Focillon
 Henri François Marion
 Henri Gouhier
 Henri Laborit
 Henri Lefebvre
 Henri Poincaré
 Henri Wallon (psychologist)
 Henricus Regius
 Henrik Steffens
 Henry Aristippus
 Henry Babcock Veatch
 Henry Corbin
 Henry David Thoreau
 Henry E. Kyburg, Jr.
 Henry Flynt
 Henry George
 Henry Habberley Price
 Henry Harclay
 Henry Home
 Henry Home, Lord Kames
 Henry James, Sr.
 Henry Johnstone Jr.
 Henry Jones (philosopher)
 Henry Longueville Mansel
 Henry Margenau
 Henry More
 Henry Moyes
 Henry of Ghent
 Henry of Harclay
 Henry Pachter
 Henry Philip Tappan
 Henry Sidgwick
 Henry Stanton
 Henry Suso
 Henry William Chandler
 Henryk Skolimowski
 Hentisberus
 Heraclides Lembus
 Heraclides of Aenus
 Heraclides of Pontus
 Heraclides Ponticus
 Heraclitus
 Heraclitus of Ephesus
 Heraclius the Cynic
 Herbert Feigl
 Herbert Lionel Adolphus Hart
 Herbert Marcuse
 Herbert McCabe
 Herbert Paul Grice
 Herbert Simon
 Herbert Spencer
 Herbert Spiegelberg
 Herbert Witzenmann
 Herbrand's Theorem
 Herd behavior
 Here
 Here is a hand
 Hereditary property
 Heresy in Judaism
 Herillus
 Hermagoras of Amphipolis
 Herman Dooyeweerd
 Herman of Carinthia
 Herman Oliphant
 Herman Philipse
 Herman Tønnessen
 Herman Van Breda
 Hermann Blumenau
 Hermann Cohen
 Hermann Friedrich Wilhelm Hinrichs
 Hermann Graf Keyserling
 Hermann Lotze
 Hermann Samuel Reimarus
 Hermann Schwarz (philosopher)
 Hermann Theodor Hettner
 Hermann Ulrici
 Hermann von Helmholtz
 Hermann Weyl
 Hermannus Alemannus
 Hermarchus
 Hermeneutic circle
 Hermeneutics
 Hermetica
 Hermeticism
 Hermias (philosopher)
 Hermias of Atarneus
 Herminus
 Hermippus of Smyrna
 Hermocrates (dialogue)
 Hermodorus
 Hermogenes (philosopher)
 Hermotimus of Clazomenae
 Hermsprong
 Heroic realism
 Heroic theory of invention and scientific development
 Heroic virtue
 Hervaeus Natalis
 Hesiod
 Hestiaeus of Perinthus
 Heterological
 Heteronomy
 Heteronormativity
 Heterophenomenology
 Heterotopia (space)
 Heuristic
 Heuristic argument
 Heuristics
 Hexis
 Hey Rub-a-Dub-Dub: A Book of the Mystery and Wonder and Terror of Life
 Heydar Huseynov
 Heymeric de Campo
 Hibat Allah Abu'l-Barakat al-Baghdaadi
 Hicetas
 Hidden variable
 Hierarchical epistemology
 Hierarchy
 Hierarchy of genres
 Hierarchy of knowledge
 Hierius
 Hiero (Xenophon)
 Hierocles (Stoic)
 Hierocles of Alexandria
 Hieronymus Medices
 Hieronymus of Rhodes
 Hierophany
 High modernism
 High Treason Incident
 Higher-order logic
 Higher-order logics
 Higher-order volition
 Higher mental plane
 Hilary Bok
 Hilary Kornblith
 Hilary Lawson
 Hilary Putnam
 Hilbert's Program
 Hildegard of Bingen
 Hillel ben Samuel of Verona
 Hillel of Verona
 Himerius
 Hinayana
 Hinayana Buddhism
 Hindsight bias
 Hindu idealism
 Hindu philosophy
 Hinduism
 Hipparchia of Maroneia
 Hipparchus (dialogue)
 Hippasus
 Hippias
 Hippias Major
 Hippias Minor
 Hippias of Elis
 Hippo (philosopher)
 Hippocrates
 Hippocrates of Cos
 Hippocratic Oath
 Hippolyte Taine
 Hirata Atsutane
 Hiroki Azuma
 Hisbah
 Hisdosus
 Historian's fallacy
 Historical determinism
 Historical fallacy
 Historical materialism
 Historical subject
 Historical vedic religion
 Historicism
 Historicism (art)
 Historicity (philosophy)
 Historiography
 Historism
 History and Class Consciousness
 History and Future of Justice
 History and philosophy of science
 History monoid
 History of aesthetics (pre-20th-century)
 History of anarchism
 History of Animals
 History of communism
 History of Consciousness
 History of ethics
 History of evolutionary thought
 History of logic
 History of Materialism and Critique of its Present Importance
 History of painting
 History of philosophy
 History of philosophy in Poland
 History of Political Philosophy
 History of political thinking
 History of pseudoscience
 History of the Church–Turing thesis
 History of the concept of creativity
 History of western philosophy
 History of Western Philosophy (Russell)
 Ho Yen
 Hobson's choice
 Holarchy
 Hold come what may
 Hold more stubbornly at least
 Hölderlin's Hymn "The Ister"
 Holism
 Holmes Rolston III
 Holocentric
 Hologram
 Holon (philosophy)
 Holy
 Holy History of Mankind
 Homage to Catalonia
 Homeland
 Homer
 Homes Not Jails
 Homeschooling
 Homestead principle
 Homo consumericus
 Homo faber
 Homo sacer
 Homoiousian
 Homology (trait)
 Homomorphism
 Homonoia
 Homonymy
 Homoousian
 Homoousios
 Homosexuality
 Homunculus
 Homunculus argument
 Hōnen
 Honesty
 Hong Liangji
 Hong Zicheng
 Honor
 Honorio Delgado
 Honour
 Hope
 Hope (virtue)
 Horace Kallen
 Horace Romano Harré
 Horatio Dresser
 Horizon
 Horizon anarchism
 Horizontalidad
 Horn clause
 Horror vacui (physics)
 Horror Victorianorum
 Horseshoe
 Horus (athlete)
 Hosoi Heishu
 Hospitality
 Hossein Nasr
 Hossein Ziai
 Hostile media effect
 Hostile Takeover Trilogy
 Hoter ben Shlomo
 Hourya Sinaceur
 House of hospitality
 Houston Stewart Chamberlain
 How Are We to Live?
 How many angels can dance on the head of a pin?
 How the Self Controls Its Brain
 Howard Adelman
 Howard Kainz
 Howard Robinson
 Howard V. and Edna H. Hong Kierkegaard Library
 Howard Williams (humanitarian)
 Howard Zinn
 Howison Lectures in Philosophy
 Hryhorii Savych Skovoroda
 Hryhorii Skovoroda
 Hsi K'ang
 Hsiao
 Hsing Yun
 Hsun Tsu
 Hsün Tsu
 Hsün Tsǔ
 Hsun Tzu
 Hsün Tzu
 Hsün Tzǔ
 Hu Qiaomu
 Hu Shi
 Hu Shih
 Huainanzi
 Huan Tan
 Huang Tsung-hsi
 Huang Zongxi
 Huangdi Sijing
 Huangdi Yinfujing
 Huashu
 Huayan school
 Hubert Damisch
 Hubert Dreyfus
 Hubert Schleichert
 Huberto Rohden
 Hudson River School
 Hugh Binning
 Hugh Blair
 Hugh Everett III
 Hugh J. Silverman
 Hugh Kenner
 Hugh MacColl
 Hugh Mellor
 Hugh of Saint Victor
 Hugh of St Cher
 Hugh of St Victor
 Hugo Adam Bedau
 Hugo Cores
 Hugo Dingler
 Hugo Grotius
 Hugo Kołłątaj
 Hugo Kükelhaus
 Hugo Perls
 Hugues Felicité Robert de Lamennais
 Hui Shi
 Hui Shih
 Huigh de Groot
 Huineng
 Huiyuan (Buddhist)
 Human
 Human beings
 Human beings in Buddhism
 Human cloning
 Human condition
 Human enhancement
 Human exceptionalism
 Human extinction
 Human figure (aesthetics)
 Human nature
 Human physical appearance
 Human reliability
 Human rights
 Human sciences
 Human self-reflection
 Human sexuality
 Human spirit
 Human, All Too Human
 Humana.Mente – Journal of Philosophical Studies
 Humanism
 Humanism (life stance)
 Humanism and Its Aspirations
 Humanism in France
 Humanism in Germany
 Humanist Manifesto
 Humanist Manifesto I
 Humanist Manifesto II
 Humanist Movement
 Humanist Society Scotland
 Humanistic naturalism
 Humanistic psychology
 Humanitarian-political
 Humanitarianism
 Humanitas
 Humberto Maturana
 Hume's fork
 Hume's Law
 Hume's principle
 Hume and the Problem of Causation
 Hume Studies
 Humility
 Humor
 Humor research
 Humors
 Humour
 Humours
 Humphry Ditton
 Humster
 Hundred Schools of Thought
 Hunein Ibn Ishak
 Husserliana
 Huston Smith
 Hutchins Hapgood
 Hwang Jang-yop
 Hyacinthe Sigismond Gerdil
 Hybrid logic
 Hydriotaphia, Urn Burial
 Hyle
 Hylomorphism
 Hylopathism
 Hylozoism
 Hypatia
 Hypatia: A Journal of Feminist Philosophy
 Hyperbolic discounting
 Hypergraphy
 Hypermodernism (art)
 Hypermodernity
 Hyperreality
 Hypokeimenon
 Hypomnema
 Hypostasis (Neoplatonism)
 Hypostasis (philosophy)
 Hypostatic abstraction
 Hypothesis
 Hypothetical
 Hypothetical construct
 Hypothetical imperative
 Hypothetical syllogism
 Hypothetico-deductive model
 Hywel Lewis

Philosophy